Dee L. Clayman is an American classical scholar and a professor of Classics at the City University of New York. She is a pioneer in the effort to digitize the humanities and served as president of the Society for Classical Studies.

Education 
Clayman earned a bachelor’s degree in Greek with honors from Wellesley College. She holds a MA in Latin and Greek as well as a Ph.D in Classical Studies, from the University of Pennsylvania.

Career 
Clayman began her career in 1972 as an assistant professor at Brooklyn College, ultimately rising to the position of Professor of Classics in 1982. Beginning in 1985, Clayman also served as Professor of Classics at the Graduate Center of the City University of New York where she is Executive Officer of the PhD Program in Classics.

Her areas of academic research interest include the Hellenistic period, with specific emphasis on the work of Callimachus, Theocritus, Apollonius of Rhodes and the epigrammatists.

An early adopter of using digital technology to explore the classics, Clayman is the recipient of 10 individual grants from the National Endowment for the Humanities and various private foundations to support the development of an online database of classical bibliography. This effort, which attempts to catalog scholarly work about ancient Greek and Latin language, linguistics and history as well as Roman history, literature, and philosophy from the second millennium B.C. to roughly 500-800 A.D.,  has significantly expanded global access to a wide variety of research materials. The project was initially published in 1995 as a set of CD-ROMs and is now incorporated with the Année philologique.

In addition to her academic work, Clayman was the founding editor-in-chief of Oxford Bibliographies: Classics. She previously served as president of the Société internationale de bibliographie classique, and is past-president of the American Philological Association, now known as the Society for Classical Studies.

Clayman is a member of the Institute for Advanced Study in Princeton, New Jersey.

Selected works

Books 
 Queen Berenice II and the Golden Age of Ptolemaic Egypt
 Timon of Philus: Pyrrhonism into Poetry
 Callimachus’ Iambi

Articles 
 “Callimachus’ Doric Graces (15 G.-P. = AP 5.146)”
 “Did Any Berenike Attend the Isthmian Games? A Literary Perspective on Posidippus 82 AB”
 Database of Classical Bibliography
 "Trends and Issues in Quantitative Stylistics."
 "Time Series Analysis of Word Length in Oedipus the King,"
 "The Meaning of Corinna's Weroia."

Awards 
 Fellowship, National Endowment for the Humanities, 2010–11
 Senior Fellowship, American Council of Learned Societies, 2002-3
 Medal for Distinguished Service, American Philological Association, 1999

References 

Year of birth missing (living people)
Living people
Wellesley College alumni
University of Pennsylvania alumni
American scholars of ancient Greek philosophy
City University of New York alumni
Brooklyn College faculty
20th-century American non-fiction writers
20th-century American women writers
21st-century American women